The 1976 season was the original Tampa Bay Rowdies second season of existence, and their second season in the North American Soccer League, the top division of soccer in the United States and Canada at that time. Tampa Bay entered the season as the defending Soccer Bowl champions.

Overview
The defense of the Rowdies' NASL title began with the club going on a four-match preseason tour of Haiti. After winning the 1976 indoor tournament, the team later played two addition preseason games against the San Antonio Thunder at high schools in the Tampa Bay Area. The mercurial English star, Rodney Marsh was introduced as team captain on April 22, but resigned the post after just eleven days, handing the job to fellow Englishman, Tommy Smith. In the NASL season, the Rowdies finished with a league-best record of 18–6, which placed them first in the Eastern Division of the Atlantic Conference. As regular season champions, they qualified for the playoffs with home field advantage throughout. In an upset, they fell to Toronto Metros-Croatia, 0–2, in the conference finals. Toronto went on to win the Soccer Bowl. For the second consecutive season South African striker, Derek Smethurst was the club leader in scoring with 20 goals, a total which also led the league.

Club

Roster

Management and technical staff 
 George W. Strawbridge, Jr., owner
 Beau Rodgers, general manager
 Eddie Firmani, head coach
 Ken Shields, trainer
 Francisco Marcos, public relations director
 Alfredo Beronda, equipment manager

Honors 
Seven different Rowdies received nine individual honors following the 1976 NASL season.
 NASL North American Player of the Year: Arnie Mausser
 NASL Coach of the Year: Eddie Firmani
 NASL Leading goal scorer: Derek Smethurst (20 goals)
 NASL All-Star, First Team: Arnie Mausser
 NASL All-Star, First Team: Tommy Smith
 NASL All-Star, First Team: Rodney Marsh
 NASL All-Star, Second Team: Stewart Jump
 NASL All-Star, Second Team: Derek Smethurst
 NASL All-Star, Second Team: Stewart Scullion

Competitions

Preseason friendlies 
In January 1976 Tampa Bay made a four match tour of Haiti. The first was a, 1–1, draw on January 13 versus the Haitian National Team before a crowd of 21,000. Two days later another 21,000 witnessed the National Team defeat the Rowdies, 1–0. The third match of the tour was played on January 17, against the club side Racing CH with Tampa Bay dominating, 4–1, as 21,500 looked on. In the final Haitian game, the Rowdies edged Victory SC, 2–1, before 13,000 fans.

In early April Tampa Bay also played back-to-back friendlies with the San Antonio Thunder. The first was a 1–2 defeat, played at Sarasota High School which drew 2,845 fans. The following night as Tarpon Springs High School the teams played to a 0–0 draw before 2,500 onlookers. Tampa Bay finished the preseason with a record of 2–2–2.

Results

North American Soccer League season
The Rowdies finished the regular season with 154 points, positioning them in 1st place in the Eastern Division of the Atlantic Conference, and first overall out of 20 NASL teams. After a solid 8–4 start to the season, Tampa Bay finished even stronger with a 10–2 record the rest of the way for a league-best record of 18–6. They earned two more victories than their nearest foe. They scored 58 goals, which was second in the league, while their 30 goals-against tied them with three other clubs as the fewest. As regular season champions, Tampa Bay also earned home field advantage throughout the playoffs. The club averaged 16,452 fans per game in the regular season, with three matches surpassing 15,000, one reaching 32,000, and still another topping 42,000.

Regular-season standings 
W = Wins, L = Losses, GF = Goals For, GA = Goals Against, BP = Bonus Points, Pts= point system

6 points for a win, 1 point for a shootout win, 0 points for a loss, 1 point for each regulation goal scored up to three per game.
-League Premiers (most points). -Other playoff teams.

Regular season results

NASL playoffs 
Tampa Bay's two home playoff matches drew more than 36,000 and 28,000 respectively.

Playoff results

Playoff bracket

Statistics

Season scoring
GP = Games Played, G = Goals (worth 2 points), A = Assists (worth 1 point), Pts = Points

Season goalkeeping
Note: GP = Games played; Min = Minutes played; Svs = Saves; GA = Goals against; GAA = Goals against average; W = Wins; L = Losses

Playoff scoring
GP = Games Played, G = Goals (worth 2 points), A = Assists (worth 1 point), Pts = Points

Playoff goalkeeping
Note: GP = Games played; Min = Minutes played; Svs = Saves; GA = Goals against; GAA = Goals against average; W = Wins; L = Losses

Player movement

In

Out

See also 

 1976 North American Soccer League season
 1976 in American soccer
 Tampa Bay Rowdies (1975–1993)

References 

 1976 Rowdies results

Tampa Bay Rowdies
1976
Tampa Bay Rowdies (1975–1993) seasons
Tampa Bay Rowdies
Tampa Bay Rowdies
Sports in Tampa, Florida